In mathematics, the Marcinkiewicz interpolation theorem, discovered by , is a result bounding the norms of non-linear operators acting on Lp spaces.

Marcinkiewicz' theorem is similar  to the Riesz–Thorin theorem about linear operators, but also applies to non-linear operators.

Preliminaries
Let f be a measurable function with real or complex values, defined on a measure space (X, F, ω).  The distribution function of f is defined by

Then f is called weak  if there exists a constant C such that the distribution function of f satisfies the following inequality for all t > 0:

Any  function belongs to L1,w and in addition one has the inequality

This is nothing but Markov's inequality (aka Chebyshev's Inequality). The converse is not true. For example, the function 1/x belongs to L1,w but not to L1.

Similarly, one may define the weak  space as the space of all functions f such that  belong to L1,w, and the weak  norm using

More directly, the Lp,w norm is defined as the best constant C in the inequality

for all t > 0.

Formulation
Informally, Marcinkiewicz's theorem is

Theorem.
 
In other words, even if one only requires weak boundedness on the extremes p and q, regular boundedness still holds. To make this more formal, one has to explain that T is bounded only on a dense subset and can be completed. See Riesz-Thorin theorem for these details.

Where Marcinkiewicz's theorem is weaker than the Riesz-Thorin theorem is in the estimates of the norm. The theorem gives bounds for the  norm of T but this bound increases to infinity as r converges to either p or q.  Specifically , suppose that

so that the operator norm of T from Lp to Lp,w is at most Np, and the operator norm of T from Lq to Lq,w is at most Nq.  Then the following interpolation inequality holds for all r between p and q and all f ∈ Lr:

where

and

The constants δ and γ can also be given for q = ∞ by passing to the limit.

A version of the theorem also holds more generally if T is only assumed to be a quasilinear operator  in the following sense: there exists a constant C > 0 such that T satisfies

for almost every x. The theorem holds precisely as stated, except with γ replaced by

An operator T (possibly quasilinear) satisfying an estimate of the form

is said to be of weak type (p,q).  An operator is simply of type (p,q) if T is a bounded transformation from Lp to Lq:

A more general formulation of the interpolation theorem is as follows:

 If T is a quasilinear operator of weak type (p0, q0) and of weak type (p1, q1) where q0 ≠ q1, then for each θ ∈ (0,1), T is of type (p,q), for p and q with p ≤ q of the form

The latter formulation follows from the former through an application of Hölder's inequality and a duality argument.

Applications and examples
A famous application example is the Hilbert transform. Viewed as a multiplier, the Hilbert transform of a function f can be computed by first taking the Fourier transform of f, then multiplying by the sign function, and finally applying the inverse Fourier transform.

Duality arguments show that it is also bounded for 2 < p < ∞. In fact, the Hilbert transform is really unbounded for p equal to 1 or ∞.

Another famous example is the Hardy–Littlewood maximal function, which is only sublinear operator rather than linear. The weak (1,1) estimate can be obtained from the Vitali covering lemma.

History
The theorem was almost forgotten by Zygmund, and was absent from his original works on the theory of singular integral operators. Later  realized that Marcinkiewicz's result could greatly simplify his work, at which time he published his former student's theorem together with a generalization of his own.

In 1964 Richard A. Hunt and Guido Weiss published a new proof of the Marcinkiewicz interpolation theorem.

See also 
 Interpolation space

References

 .
 .

 .

Fourier analysis
Theorems in functional analysis
Lp spaces